Fred Lowen AM (1919–2005), born Fritz Karl Heinz Lowenstein, was a German-Australian designer and an inductee into the Design Institute of Australia Hall of Fame.

Biography
Lowen was born as Fritz Karl Heinz Loewenstein in 1919 in Upper Silesia, then a part of Germany. Being Jewish, he fled Germany in 1938 to Belgium. In May 1940 he again fled the Nazis and made it to England. From there he was transported to Australia on the HMT Dunera arriving in Sydney on 6 September 1940. His father was Karl Loewenstein, later deported to Minsk Ghetto and Theresienstadt concentration camp.

Starting in September 1945, Lowen designed and made wooden salad bowls, trays and lazy susans with Ernest Rodeck under the name of FLER. He manufactured a Fred Ward-designed chair for the Myer department store in Melbourne, Victoria.  Between 1955 and 1958, Lowen designed the SC55 and SC58, the Aluminium Shell Chair, mahogany fold-out extension table and cane back chairs.  The Narvik dining and lounge ranges were released in 1961, the Fleronde (1964/65), dining setting (1966/67), desk and chair for the Australian Exhibition at Expo 67 in Montreal, Quebec, Canada, and Flerena in 1968.

Lowen started Twen in 1968 and designed the Twen-1 range (1968) and Twen-2 in 1969. In 1970 Lowen designed the T-21 range and model T-4. In 1972 Twen was reborn as Tessa. The T-6 (1973), the T-8 range (with and without armrests) designed in 1976, and the T-9 followed. In the 1980s Lowen designed the Delmont (1980), Sarina (1981) and Sling (1981).

In May 1987 Lowen became a Member of the Order of Australia (AM). He wrote an autobiography Fred Lowen: Dunera Boy, Furniture Designer, Artist, which was published in 2001. He died in Melbourne in 2005.

References

1919 births
2005 deaths
Australian designers
Jewish emigrants from Nazi Germany to Australia
Members of the Order of Australia
People from the Province of Upper Silesia
Silesian Jews
People interned during World War II
Australian people of Silesian descent